Timothy Jay Mathews (born January 9, 1970) is an American former professional baseball pitcher. He played all or parts of eight seasons in Major League Baseball (MLB) for the St. Louis Cardinals, Oakland Athletics, and Houston Astros.

Mathews was one of the players traded from the St. Louis Cardinals at the 1997 trading deadline in exchange for Mark McGwire. From 2003 to 2006, Mathews pitched for the independent Bridgeport Bluefish and had stints with the Los Angeles Dodgers and Houston Astros Triple-A clubs. In 2006, he was signed by the Pawtucket Red Sox to close out his professional career.

Mathews' father Nelson had a six-season MLB career as an outfielder.

See also
List of second-generation Major League Baseball players

External links

1970 births
Living people
American expatriate baseball players in Canada
Arkansas Travelers players
Baseball players from Illinois
Bridgeport Bluefish players
Hamilton Redbirds players
Houston Astros players
Las Vegas 51s players
Louisville Redbirds players
Major League Baseball pitchers
Memphis Redbirds players
New Orleans Zephyrs players
Oakland Athletics players
Pawtucket Red Sox players
People from Columbia, Illinois
Round Rock Express players
Sacramento River Cats players
Sportspeople from Belleville, Illinois
Springfield Cardinals players
St. Louis Cardinals players
St. Petersburg Cardinals players
STLCC Archers baseball players
UNLV Rebels baseball players
Vancouver Canadians players